Caunt is a surname. Notable people with the surname include:

Ben Caunt (1815–1861), English bare-knuckle boxer 
Frederic Caunt (1859–1933), English Archdeacon of Saint Kitts

See also
Cant (surname)